Over time, two Greek banks have been named the Bank of Athens. Both had their headquarters in Athens, Greece. The first Bank of Athens was founded in 1893 and operated in the Balkans and Eastern Mediterranean until its acquisition by the National Bank of Greece in 1953. In 1993, the second Bank of Athens was founded, and merged with Eurobank Ergasias in 1999. Subsidiaries of the Bank of Athens have been incorporated into foreign financial entities. Some banks in the US have incorporated the phrase "Bank of Athens" into their names.

First Bank of Athens (1894  1962)

In 1893, E. Empeirikos, A. Lambrinoudis, A. Kallergis, M. Lordanopoulos, and N. Triantafyllidis founded the Bank of Athens using Greek, French, and English capital. The bank opened for business in 1894. In 1895, the bank established branches in London, Constantinople, Smyrna, and Khartoum. 

In 1896, Jean (John) Pesmatzoglou, an Alexandrian private banker, merged his bank with the Bank of Athens and became chairman of the Bank of Athens. In 1904, Pesmatzoglou aligned the Bank of Athens with the Banque de l'Union Parisienne. Pesmatzoglou's bank became the Bank of Athens branch in Alexandria, Egypt, where there was a large Greek community. In 1902, a branch was opened in Manchester.

In 1906, the Bank of Athens purchased the Industrial Credit Bank (Τράπεζα Επαγγελματικής Πίστεως), an entity that had operated in Athens since 1873. The Industrial Credit Bank had offices in Istanbul and possibly in Smyrna. By 1910, the Bank of Athens had opened branches in Chania, Heraklion, Rethymno, and Trabzon and Samsoun.

In 1921, the Bank of Athens opened an office in New York City. By 1922, the bank had branches throughout Greece, in Limassol and Nicosia, Alexandria, Cairo, Port Said, Galata, Stamboul, Beyoğlu, Edirne, London and Manchester. In 1923, following the Greco-Turkish War, the Government of Turkey seized the Bank's office in Constantinople.

In 1926, the bank's New York City office became a subsidiary called the "Bank of Athens Trust Company".

In 1930, the National Bank of Greece and the Bank of Athens combined their activities in Egypt to form a subsidiary, the "Banque Nationale de Grèce et d’Athénes". By the 1930s, the Bank of Athens also had offices in Korçë and Durrës.

In 1941, during the Axis Occupation of Greece, the Dresdner Bank assumed oversight of the bank.

In 1947, the bank founded the South African Bank of Athens to serve Hellenes residing in South Africa. It is a 99.79% subsidiary of National Bank of Greece.

In 1953, the Bank of Athens merged with National Bank of Greece to form the "National Bank of Greece and Athens". In New York City, the two banks merged their subsidiaries into the Atlantic Bank of New York.

Second Bank of Athens (1992  1999)
In 1992, the National Bank of Greece owned seventy-five percent of the Credit Bank of Professionals (Τράπεζα Επαγγελματικής Πίστεως), when it sold sixty-seven percent of its holdings to the Hanwha Bank. The Hanwha Bank was renamed the Bank of Athens. In 1998, Eurobank Ergasias, a member of the Latsis Group, bought fifty-eight percent of the Bank of Athens' common stock. In 1999, Eurobank Ergasias absorbed the Bank of Athens.

Bank of Athens in foreign nations
The name Bank of Athens has been used in the branding of several banks in the US. 

The First National Bank of Athens arrived in Europe from the USA. It was merged with a small British private bank to form the Gunners Bishop Bank of Athens. This bank operated as a British bank in the City of London (Fenchurch Street, London EC3). This was Greece's representative bank in London from 1860 until 27 February 1953 when it became part of Barclays Bank PLC of London.

A 1906 Act of Parliament had regulated the industrial and state banks in Britain giving Greece's representative banks an official status. When the World Trade Centre opened in London, the Bank of Athens was invited. Also in 1906, the Bank of Athens was absorbed by the International Credit Industry Banque de Grece, in France, becoming the bank's presence in Europe. This bank also carried out British Government business from 1908 as the "London Bankers". The bank opened a branch in Constantinople-Karakkoy in 1906, when the Banque D'Athenes worked with French Treasury, Basel II with Bourse de Paris and Constantinople.

In 1930, the "Banque Nationale de Grece and d'Áthenes, France" was created via mergers and in 1932, it moved to London.

In 1956, the First National Bank of Athens arrived in the US.

The South African Bank of Athens (known locally as "Bank of Athens"), has been operating since 1947.

The Banque D Ahenes Tennessee branch of Bank of Athens FDIC2114/1866 established a branch in Paris, France, in 1893 under the name of Banque D Athens-1893. In 1906 this was merged with the State of Georgia Bank of Athens FDIC2114.

References

Banks established in 1893
Banks disestablished in 1999
Defunct banks of Greece
Economy of Athens
Modern history of Athens
1999 disestablishments in Greece
Greek companies established in 1893